Steere's liocichla (Liocichla steerii) is a bird in the family Leiothrichidae. The species was first described by Robert Swinhoe in 1877.

It is endemic to Taiwan.

References

Collar, N. J. & Robson C. 2007. Family Timaliidae (Babblers)  pp. 70 – 291 in; del Hoyo, J., Elliott, A. & Christie, D.A. eds. Handbook of the Birds of the World, Vol. 12. Picathartes to Tits and Chickadees. Lynx Edicions, Barcelona.

Steere's liocichla
Endemic birds of Taiwan
Steere's liocichla
Taxonomy articles created by Polbot